Dhubri District (Pron:ˈdʊbri) is an administrative district in the Indian state of Assam. The district headquarters are located at Dhubri town which is situated at ~290 km from Guwahati. This was also the headquarters of erstwhile undivided Goalpara district which was created in 1876 by the British government. In 1983, Goalpara district was divided into four districts and Dhubri is one among those. Dhubri district is one among the many Muslim-majority districts of Assam. In 2016, Dhubri was divided again to form South Salmara-Mankachar District.

As of 2011 it is the second most populous district of Assam (out of 27), after Nagaon.

Etymology
The name Dhubri is derived from a story of Padma Purana of Behula-Lakhindar, where the main character of the story, who is called Behula during the period as the person had taken the path she followed to make a devoted visit to her dead husband going to the still living Lakhindar. Behula arrived at the bank of Brahmaputra called Netai. She had worked for the heaven gods such as Shiv, Partbati and others, and washed her clothes on a big stone at the bank of the Brahmaputra river called "Netai Dhubunir Ghat".

History

In the past, the gateway of western Assam was a meeting place of diverse racial groups which mingled together and formed a unique cultural heritage and historical background. The growth of blended culture in this region, particularly in the areas of language, art and religion is due to the continuous process of assimilation of various races, castes, and creeds of local people, invaders, and migrated people.

In 1669 C.E., the Kacchwaha Rajput Mirza Raja Ram Singh I of Amber was deputed by Emperor Aurangzeb to crush a rebellion by the Ahom king Chakradhwaj Singha. But Assam was a difficult country for such an operation and Raja Ram Singh requested Guru Teg Bahadur (Punjabi: ਗੁਰੂ ਤੇਗ਼ ਬਹਾਦੁਰ, Hindi: गुरू तेग़ बहादुर) to accompany him. Guru's role was proved to be much more crucial than his mere presence. This operation was actually a punishment for Ram Singh because it was from his custody that Shivaji and his son had escaped, a few years earlier.

Sites

The Historic Panbari Mosques is situated on the National Highway 31, about 25 km east from Dhubri town, near Panbari and Rangamati, is considered to be the oldest mosque in the Indian state of Assam. It was built by an able administrator Hussain Shah in between 1493 and 1519 C.E., Who was then the Governor of Bengal. This mosque was used as a prayer hall by the Mughal Muslim Soldiers. There is also an Idgah and a deep well which were also probably constructed during that period. Panbari "Pahar", thus is known as the holy seat of the Muslims in Assam. It is said that about 200 years ago, the local people of this place found this mosque in Panbari "Pahar" under the thick foliage. They cleaned this place and started to offer Namaz there. During ‘Idd’ this mosque bears a special look. Thousands of people from different parts of the country visit this mosque. Not only the people from India but also from the United Kingdom and Japan visit this place. But the masjid is fast losing its glory due to lack of proper maintenance.

Panchpeer Dargaha It is Mazar Sharif of five Sufi Saints who accompanied Raja Ram Singh during the times of the Mughal conflict with the Ahom Regime of Assam

Modern-day Dhubri district was created on 1 July 1983 when it was split from Goalpara district.

Geography

Dhubri District is bounded both by interstate and international borders: West Bengal and Bangladesh in the west; Goalpara and Bogaigoan district of Assam and Garo Hills district of Meghalaya in the east; Kokrajhar district in the north; and Bangladesh and state of Meghalaya in the south.The district is located on the globe between 89.42 and 90.12 degree east longitude and 26.22 to 25.28 degree north latitude and situated at 30 meters above the sea level on an average. General topography of Dhubri district is plain with patches of small hillocks like Tokorabandha, Dudhnath, Chandardinga, Boukuamari, Boropahar, Chakrasila, etc. All these are situated in the north eastern part of the district. Mighty river Brahmaputra is flowing through this district from east to west with its tributaries like Champabati, Gourang, Gadadhar, Gangadhar, Tipkai, Sankosh, Silai, Jinjiram, etc. The average annual rainfall of the district is 2,916 mm.

Economy
Dhubri District is primarily dependent on agricultural and forest products. The main source of income is paddy (both winter and autumn) with surplus production. Jute and mustard seed occupy the major share of cash crops. Wheat, maize, pulses and sugar cane are also grown moderately. From forest, mainly timber and bamboo add to the income, though boulders and sand are also available. Fish, milk, meat, and eggs have small contribution to the economy. Currently three tea gardens, whose contribution to the district economy is almost negligible, cover an area of 1362.33 hectares. Land revenue collection is minimal, whereas tax from check gates and excise duty occupy much of the government exchequer. Devoid of major industrial production, the district uses more funds for administration, development, and welfare works than it provides.

Its rich natural wealth is yet to be explored and some believe that proper utilization of natural resources could provide a boost for the struggling economy.

Some important production and earnings are given below:

Future Prospect, Dhubri has the capability to become the economic hub of Assam, Recent development in Medical College proposal can be a game changer for Dhubri Dist. People can get good quality of health with many major facilities within the district. Industrial revolution would be a major pull over for increase the per capital in come of people in the state. Dhubri district is already equipped with road ways, water ways, rail ways and airport which can provide the base of logistic nad transportation. The dense population of Dhubri can help in low labor cost. The major need for raw materials can be fulfilled with Assam and neighboring states. People of Assam has a great prospect in future by investing in Dhubri Dist and can observe a great out come in future.

Divisions

At present there are two sub-divisions: Dhubri (Sadar) and Bilasipara.

The district has 8 revenue circles and 7 tahsils. It has 8 police stations and 4 basic towns.

There are five Assam Legislative Assembly constituencies in this district: Dhubri, Gauripur, Golakganj, Bilasipara West, and Bilasipara East. All five are in the Dhubri Lok Sabha constituency.

Transport

Airway
Rupshi in Kokrajhar district is the nearest airport in Dhubri which is about 15  km away from the town. It was constructed during World War II by the British Govt. mainly for military purposes. Till 1983, Indian Airlines and some private commercial flights operated regularly between Calcutta, Guwahati. Now it has restarted under UDAAN. There are direct flights between Rupsi Guwahati and Kolkata 4 days a week.

Waterway
The town had a very busy river port on the bank of the Brahmaputra, which was used as an international trade centre with the neighbouring countries, specially in British era. At present, the port is lying idle.

Railway
The importance of the Railway station and the MG line was also decreased since 1947, when the direct line to Calcutta was snapped as it ran through erstwhile East Pakistan (now Bangladesh). The train service has newly started on 2010 again, and it is functioning smoothly. However the train services running from the Dhubri railway station are taking a new route from Dhubri to Kamakhya and Guwahati Junction. Trains originating from Dhubri station are, Dhubri-Silghat (Rajya Rani Express), Dhubri - Siliguri (Inter City Express) and Dhubri Fakiragram passenger.

Road
NH-31(New NH-17) passes through Dhubri district and is one of the base root to connect Assam with West Bengal and other states. Toll comes near the Assam and West Bengal border Boxirhat (Dhubri-Dist.).

Demographics

According to the 2011 census Dhubri district has a population of 1,949,258, roughly equal to the nation of Lesotho or the US state of West Virginia. This gives it a ranking of 240th in India (out of a total of 640). Its population growth rate over the decade 2001-2011 was  24.4%. Dhubri has a sex ratio of 952 females for every 1000 males, and a literacy rate of 59.36%. With the bifurcation, the residual district has a population of 1,394,144.

The largest religious group in the district are the Muslims, with 1,553,023 (80%) followers, while Hindus and Christians constitute 388,380 (19.92%) and 4,107 (0.21%) inhabitants respectively. After bifurcation, the Muslims are 73.49% of the population with Hindus constituting 26.07%.

There are 62,628 Scheduled Castes making up 4.49% of the population. The Scheduled Tribes population in the district is 2,300 making up only 0.16% of the district.

It is estimated the number of Bengali speakers is much higher because the district have many Bengali Muslims, locally known as Miyas but during census enumeration, they have reported their mother tongue as Assamese in large scale.

Culture

Terracotta and pottery craft
Dhubri district of Assam have occupied a pivotal position in terracotta market of the world. The Assamese terracotta art and culture took its birth at Asharikandi, a small village near Gauripur town in Dhubri district. More than 80% families of this craft village are engaged in this ethnic based art (handicraft) and pass their life after selling these terracotta products in the national and international markets.

Places of interest 

The main places of interest in Dhubri district include Rangamati or Panbari Mosque, the oldest mosque in entire northeast region of India, Chakrashila Wildlife Sanctuary, Gurdwara Sri Guru Tegh Bahadur Sahib, Mahamaya Dham, Garden and Panchpeer Dargah.

This place is known for the Sikh Gurdwara namely Gurdwara Damdama Sahib or Thara Sahib which was constructed in memory of visit of First Sikh Guru Nanak Dev (Punjabi: ਗੁਰੂ ਨਾਨਕ, Hindi: गुरु नानक, Urdu: گرونانک Guru Nānak) and later it was followed by visit of Ninth guru, Guru Tegh Bahadur (Punjabi: ਗੁਰੂ ਤੇਗ਼ ਬਹਾਦੁਰ, Hindi: गुरू तेग़ बहादुर) and the Gurdwara is named as Gurdwara Sri Guru Tegh Bahadur Sahib. Hence, it has great importance for Sikh community.

Main towns in Dhubri district are Dhubri, Gauripur, Bilasipara, Golakganj, Tamarhat, Sapatgram, Chapar,  Hatsingimari,  Mankachar,  Agomani etc.

Flora and fauna
On 14 July 1994, a virgin forest patch of Dhubri District of Assam was declared as a wildlife sanctuary by the gazette notification of the Assam government. This sanctuary has been named as "Chakrashila Wildlife Sanctuary". It is the youngest sanctuary of North East India having an area of 11,260.00 acres (45.5676 km2). Chakrasila is unique because of the presence of golden langur (Presbytis geei) which is found nowhere else except along the Assam and Bhutan border. Besides, the virgin forest of Chakrasila Wildlife Sanctuary is endowed with rare specimens of trees, shrubs, medicinal plants, mammals, reptiles and birds and insects.

Geographical location of the Chakrasila Wildlife Sanctuary is in the latitude 26° 15′ to 26° 26′ N and longitude 90° 15′ to 90° 20′ E. It is in the District of Dhubri, the westernmost region of Assam. It is 68 km from the district headquarters Dhubri and 219 km from the Borjhar Airport of Guwahati City.

There are several small springs for quenching the thirst of the wild animals of this hilly forest. But the two major perennial springs in the sanctuary are howhowi Jhora and Bamuni Jhora, which flow over the rocks, sparkling and spattering throughout the year, adding to the scenery of the sanctuary.

Climatic conditions of Chakrasila Wildlife Sanctuary is like that of temperate zone with dry winter and hot summer followed by heavy rains. Annual rainfall is 200 to 400 cm. Soil is azonal, forestlike and hilly. temperature throughout the year generally varies between 8 °C and 30 °C.

The diverse eco-systems of Chakrasila present a model habitat diversity and support various mammalian species like tiger, leopard, golden langur, leopard cat, gaur, mongoose, porcupine, pangoline, flying squirrel, civet cat. Along with all these prolific gifts of the nature Chakrasila has a wide variety of avifauna.

The two internationally recognized wetlands namely Dhir and Deeplai have not been yet taken inside the declared boundary of the sanctuary. But they are a part of the Chakrasila eco-system. It is expected that in due course they will be included within the sanctuary.

Education

At present the district houses 15 colleges for higher education. B. N. College, Dhubri (estd. 1946) at Dhubri is one of the oldest institutes in Assam. Sapatgram College situated in Sapatgram town is imparts degree BA and certificates HSSLC in Art's stream Bilasipara College situated in bilasipara town also imparts degrees (BA and BSc) and certificates (HSSLC) in the science and arts streams. Ratnapeeth College of Chapar is another prominent college of the district. The Government Boys Higher secondary School and Bidyapara Boys' Higher secondary school are the two important schools of Dhubri town and the oldest too. Happy Convent School is also one of the best schools affiliated by CBSE.

One Industrial Training Institute and some 30 number of private run computer institutes are there.

More than hundred high and higher secondary schools are also imparting education to the people of the district.
ASIAN MISSION INSTITUTE a vocational training centre is imparting education to the people.

Prominent personalities from Dhubri District 

Pramathesh Barua, One of the pioneers of Indian Cinema. Directed and acted in many films in the pre-independence era.
Pratima Barua Pandey, The Queen of folk music. She is a legend of Goalpariya folk music. 
Silabhadra, Original name Rebati Mohan Dutta Choudhury, Sahitya Akademy winner novelist.
Kalicharan Brahma, a 20th-century social and religious reformer of Bodo society.
Sarat Chandra Singha, Ex Chief Minister of Assam. He was known for his simplicity and honesty. 
Parbati Barua, Internationally acclaimed "Queen of the Elephant".
Abdul Hamid, former MP. Represented Dhubri MP Constituency for three times.
Javed Zaman, First cricketer from Assam to play for India A team. A veteran Ranji player for Assam and Railways.
 B. C. Sanyal was a famous Indian painter who have been born and brought up in Dhubri.
 Tapas Sen ( 11 September 1924 – 28 June 2006) was a noted Indian stage lighting designer who was born and brought up in Dhubri.
 Priyadarshini Chatterjee, is an Indian model and beauty pageant titleholder who was crowned Femina Miss India World in 2016. She represented India at the Miss World 2016 pageant. She is the first Indian Bengali women from Dhubri district to represent India at Miss World.
 Saifuddin Ahmed Born in Assam, Bangladeshi Actor.

References

External links
 Dhubri district official website

 
Districts of Assam
Minority Concentrated Districts in India
1983 establishments in Assam